Stella Ruiz White  (also known as Stella Ruiz or Estella White; born August 13, 1975 in Quezon City, Metro Manila, Philippines) is a former international fashion model and an actress, singer, musician, concert producer and entrepreneur from the Philippines. She achieved recognition from her role in the action movie, Sambahin Mo Ang Katawan Ko (1995). She was nominated as Best Newcomer for this role by Star Awards in 1996.

Childhood and early beginnings 
Stella is the daughter of Patricia Ruiz and Ernest Eugene White. At age 14, she was discovered by Renee Salud and became a runway and commercial model. Stella attended and graduated high school from Trinity University of Asia formerly known as Trinity College of Quezon City. During her undergraduate studies in Mass Communication at an exclusive school for women in Quezon City, Stella left school to pursue her modeling career in Singapore, Malaysia and Hong Kong. She has since toured internationally and appeared as an image model for popular clothing apparel, accessories and other Fortune 500 companies (Guess Jeans, Coach, Red Bull, Rusty Lopez, Fiona of Robinsons, Speedo, House of Sara Lee, and many others). In 1996, Stella joined the Miss Philippines beauty pageant and became one of the finalists. She was later on disqualified for being a nonresident.

Television career 
Stella became active in soap operas and television series, namely, Rio del Mar (as Eloisa) – GMA 7 Network TV Drama Series, Ipaglaban Mo – RPN 9 Network with Rudy Fernandez TV Drama Anthology, Esperanza (as Karla) – ABS-CBN 2 Network TV Drama Series, Sugo (as Denise) – GMA 7 Network TV Action-Drama Series playing opposite Ariel Rivera, which aired in 2005, and Magpakailanman (as herself) – GMA 7 Network.

Music career 
She has performed with her own band all over the Philippines (Davao, Cebu, Bohol, Baguio) and with other Filipino bands and artists abroad (Japan, Dubai, California, New York, New Jersey). Under the Galaxy Records label, Stella came out with an original by Fermin Flores entitled "Cry Over You", which appeared on MTV Asia. This song is the carrier single of a compilation along with her own rendition of "Missing You". In New York City, she performed at Times Square as well as other venues in the New York and New Jersey area.

Personal life 
She became a Democratic Committeewoman for Bergen County, NJ.

Filmography

References

External links 
 

Living people
Filipino female models
People from Quezon City
Actresses from Metro Manila
1975 births